Perepelkin Crater is an impact crater in the Arcadia quadrangle of the planet Mars. It is located at 52.8°N  latitude and 64.6°W longitude.  It is 77 km in diameter. It was named after Russian astronomer Yevgeny Perepyolkin.

Description
Much of the crater is covered with a mantle that is believed to be ice-rich and to have fallen from the atmosphere when the climate was different.  In one of the images below mantle can be seen; also some places when the mantle has disappeared, channels are visible.

Mantle
Researchers have noticed a smooth mantle covering much of Mars.  Some parts are eroded revealing rough surfaces while others possess layers.  It's generally accepted that mantle is ice-rich dust that fell from the sky as snow and ice-coated dust grains during a different climate    One evidence of its ice-rich nature is the presence of gullies which form when some of the ice melts.     Only a few hours of flow can result in erosion .   In higher latitudes, such as around Milankovic Crater, the mantle is thicker and may contain rounded shapes called scallops .   These are thought to be caused by the sublimation of ice in the mantle.  Several models have been advanced to explain them; some include a small amount of melting at times.

See also
 List of craters on Mars

References 

Arcadia quadrangle
Impact craters on Mars